Voice of Israel may refer to:
 A book by Abba Eban.
 Radio services from Israel Broadcasting Authority
 Kol Yisrael (Hebrew for "Voice of Israel"), the domestic services
 Israel Radio International, the international service, also known as Voice of Israel
 Voice of Israel, a former private internet radio station active between 2014-2015
 The Voice Israel, an Israeli reality singing competition